Stalybridge is a town in Tameside, Greater Manchester, England.  The town, together with the village of Millbrook and the surrounding countryside, contains 55 listed buildings that are recorded in the National Heritage List for England.  Of these, two are listed at Grade II*, the middle grade, and the others are at Grade II, the lowest grade.  Initially rural and agricultural, the cotton industry came to the area in 1776.  The older listed buildings are houses, farmhouses and farm buildings, and later listed buildings include structures associated with the Huddersfield Narrow Canal, mills, public houses, schools, churches, civic buildings, a bridge, and a war memorial.


Key

Buildings

Notes and references

Notes

Citations

Sources

Lists of listed buildings in Greater Manchester
Listed